Anslow is a village and civil parish in the East Staffordshire district of Staffordshire, England, about three miles [4.8 km] north-west of Burton upon Trent.   According to the 2001 census, the parish, which includes Anslow Gate had a population of 669, increased to 805 at the 2011 census.

John Lanham is currently Chairman of the Parish.
The village has a pub, The Bell Inn, which serves food daily. However, it is often thought to have two, but the popular Burnt Gate (now closed) was at 'Rough Hay' about a mile south of the settlement.

Churches
Holy Trinity Church (Church of England)

Notable people 
 Tonman Mosley, 1st Baron Anslow CB KStJ DL (1850 East Lodge, Anslow – 1933) a British businessman, judge and politician. Between 1904 and 1923 he was Chairman of the North Staffordshire Railway Company

Bibliography
Colin Owen - Anslow. The History of a Staffordshire Village. 1995.

See also
Listed buildings in Anslow

References

External links

Villages in Staffordshire
Borough of East Staffordshire